Tierra is the second studio album by L'Arc-en-Ciel, released on July 14, 1994.

Track listing

Personnel
 hyde – vocals
 ken – guitar
 tetsu – bass guitar
 sakura – drums, percussion
 Haruo Togashi – keyboards
 Kuni Tanaka – saxophone

References

1994 albums
L'Arc-en-Ciel albums
Japanese-language albums